Henri Arnaud is the name of:

 Henri Arnaud (pastor) (1641–1721), pastor of the Vaudois
 Henri Arnaud (athlete) (1891–1956), French middle-distance runner

See also 
 Henri Arnauld (1597–1692), French Catholic bishop